Mia Kaarina Laiho is a Finnish politician currently serving in the Parliament of Finland for the National Coalition Party at the Uusimaa constituency.

References

Living people
Members of the Parliament of Finland (2015–19)
Members of the Parliament of Finland (2019–23)
National Coalition Party politicians
21st-century Finnish politicians
21st-century Finnish women politicians
Women members of the Parliament of Finland
Year of birth missing (living people)